Donald J. Flamm (December 11, 1899 – Feb 15, 1998) was an American radio pioneer. He worked for the Shubert Brothers and for such stars as Al Jolson and Milton Berle. He owned numerous radio stations beginning with New York City’s WMCA, and is credited with founding ABSIE (American Broadcasting Station in Europe), the precursor of the Voice of America.

Early life
Flamm was born in Pittsburgh but attended New York City schools.

Career in broadcasting 
From a young age, Flamm was very active in the New York cultural scene. He produced plays and published a book of poems (1926). When radio station WMCA began operating in February 1925, Flamm produced much of the on-air content. Flamm is listed as the owner of WMCA from 1926. During the embryonic age of radio broadcasting, Flamm and WMCA were involved in many pioneering activities and controversies. WMCA was one of the nation’s leading radio broadcasting stations.

In December 1940, well-connected investors forced Donald Flamm to sell WMCA to industrialist Edward J. Noble for $850,000, which was about $400,000 less than its market value and the offer Flamm had previously refused from the president’s son, Elliott Roosevelt. Noble told Flamm that he would get his station “no matter what” or his Federal Communications Commission (FCC) license would be taken away. Noble had just left office as Undersecretary of Commerce. He was a friend of top White House aide Thomas Corcoran, and the purchase was handled by former FCC chief counsel William Dempsey, who shared offices with Corcoran. Later investigation showed that Flamm had succeeded in reaching President Franklin D. Roosevelt’s attention and that the president’s aide, General Edwin Watson had asked the FCC to intervene; however, Thomas Corcoran had then countermanded Watson’s order.

Flamm disputed the transaction and filed suit against Noble. The sale resulted in a Congressional investigation, an FCC investigation, and lawsuits that reached the New York Supreme Court by 1949. Flamm was eventually paid a settlement but did not get WMCA back. Noble had sold the station in 1943 to Nathan Straus, former Federal Housing Authority administrator, for $1,250,000 in order to found the “Blue Network,” which became the American Broadcasting Company (ABC). The Congressional investigation of the FCC absolved Noble, but drew a blistering dissent from the Republican minority. In 1944, lawyer John J. Sirica resigned as chief counsel to the Select Committee in protest of the handling of the case.

Donald Flamm was then offered a broadcasting job at the Office of War Information, operating radio stations for the U.S. troops in Europe. This network, called ABSIE or the American Broadcast Station in Europe, is regarded as the forerunner of the Voice of America, which is why Flamm is sometimes mentioned as the founder of VOA.

After the WMCA lawsuits, Flamm went back into private broadcasting and at various times owned a number of radio stations. In 1960, he purchased WMMM-AM Westport, Connecticut, which expanded with FM station WDJF (his initials) in 1970. He also owned WPAT and WPAT-FM in Paterson, New Jersey at one time. He sold the Westport stations in the 1980s.

Donald Flamm was very prominent in Jewish circles. He was an Honorary Life Member of the National Commission of the Anti-Defamation League, and endowed the Donald Flamm chair of communications of the ADL. In 1939, he was involved in a controversy with radio priest Father Coughlin after Flamm took Coughlin's anti-semitic broadcasts off WMCA.

Flamm retired to Palm Beach, Florida, where he died 15 February 1998.

References

1899 births
1998 deaths
American radio executives
Businesspeople from Pittsburgh
People of the United States Office of War Information
20th-century American businesspeople